Fred Blackburn (29 July 1902 – 1 May 1990) was a British Labour Party politician who was the Member of Parliament (MP) for Stalybridge and Hyde from the 1951 general election until 1970.

Early life
Blackburn was educated at Queen Elizabeth's Grammar School, Blackburn, St. John's College, Battersea and Manchester University. He became a teacher of modern languages and careers master at North Manchester High School. He served as a councillor on Middleton town council for ten years and published books on local government reform.

Political career
Blackburn stood for Parliament at the 1950 election in Macclesfield without success, but was elected for Stalybridge and Hyde in 1951.

He successfully defended his seat in the subsequent general elections in 1955, 1959, 1964 and 1966, but did not contest the  1970 general election.

References

External links 
 

1902 births
1990 deaths
Labour Party (UK) MPs for English constituencies
Councillors in Greater Manchester
UK MPs 1951–1955
UK MPs 1955–1959
UK MPs 1959–1964
UK MPs 1964–1966
UK MPs 1966–1970
Alumni of the University of Manchester
Members of the Parliament of the United Kingdom for Stalybridge and Hyde